Philip Williams (6 July 1884 – 6 May 1958) was an English cricketer. He played for Gloucestershire between 1919 and 1925. He captained Gloucestershire in 1922 and 1923.

References

1884 births
1958 deaths
English cricketers
People educated at Eton College
Gloucestershire cricketers
Gloucestershire cricket captains
Sportspeople from Kensington
Cricketers from Greater London
Dorset cricketers
Marylebone Cricket Club cricketers